The ministries of the Australian Capital Territory are appointed by the government each term from the members of the Australian Capital Territory Legislative Assembly. The current ministry is the Third Barr Ministry since 2020.

See also
 Members of the Australian Capital Territory Legislative Assembly
 Chief Ministers of the Australian Capital Territory